The 54th Weather Reconnaissance Squadron is an inactive United States Air Force unit. Its last assignment was to the 41st Rescue and Weather Reconnaissance Wing at Andersen Air Force Base, Guam, where it was inactivated on 30 September 1987.

The squadron was first organized as the 654th Bombardment Squadron in August 1944.  Flying de Havilland Mosquitos, the squadron provided weather and photographic reconnaissance and radar countermeasure support for VIII Bomber Command until V-E Day.  It returned to the United States and equipped with Boeing B-29 Superfortress aircraft equipped for reconnaissance missions.  Redesignated the 54th Reconnaissance Squadron it deployed to the Pacific, but arrived after hostilities had ended.  It served until inactivating in 1947.

Redesignated the 54th Strategic Reconnaissance Squadron, the squadron resumed weather reconnaissance flights from Anderson Air Force Base, Guam, including some supporting forces in the Korean War.  It was redesignated the 54th Weather Reconnaissancee Squadron in 1956 before inactivating in 1960.  The squadron was reactivated in 1962 and continued the Pacific weather reconnaissance mission until 1987.

History

World War II

Background

Weather reconnaissance for VIII Bomber Command prior to March 1944 was provided on an ad hoc basis.  The 18th Weather Squadron, which provided the command with weather observation and forecasting services through detachments located on each of the command's bases, detailed observers who flew on aircraft of various heavy bomber groups of the command. Rather than continuing to rely on individual bombardment units to perform this mission, on 22 March 1944, Eighth Air Force formed the 8th Reconnaissance Group (Provisional) at RAF Cheddington.  On 30 March, the unit was redesignated the 802d Reconnaissance Group, Special (Provisional) and in April, the group moved to RAF Watton.  The group's operational element was the 8th Reconnaissance Squadron (Provisional), which had been organized on 23 March 1944.

Operations
On 9 August 1944, the 802d Group was discontinued and its mission was transferred to the regular 25th Bombardment Group with three operational squadrons.  The 654th was primarily equipped with de Havilland Mosquitos, whose pilots had mostly entered the 802d Group from the 50th Fighter Group, where they had gained experience on fast multi-engine planes with Lockheed P-38 Lightnings.  The 654th mission focused on supplementing the long range aerial reconnaissance mission of the 7th Photographic Group on missions where its two crewmember Mosquitos could perform better than the single seat Lockheed F-5 Lightnings and Supermarine Spitfires of the 7th Group.  The mission expanded to include chaff dispensing, night photographic missions, and scouting targets for last minute weather information shortly before bomber forces were to attack them.  The speed of the Mosquito provided it a certain amount of protection from enemy fighters, but shortly after the squadron was activated, it began to receive opposition from Messerschmitt Me 262 Schwalbe jet fighters and its reconnaissance missions began to operate with friendly fighter cover.  The squadron also operated a few medium bombers on these missions.  

Following V-E Day, the 25th Group returned to the United States for inactivation.  However, the squadron remained active and re-equipped with Boeing B-29 Superfortresses.  In December, it deployed to North Field, Guam for long range weather reconnaissance  The unit flew weather reconnaissance missions for the Far East Air Forces during the early postwar years, inactivating in October 1947.

Korean War
It was reactivated in 1951 at Andersen Air Force Base, Guam. The squadron resumed its weather reconnaissance mission with WB-29s; upgrading to Boeing WB-50D Superfortresses in 1955. It often flew hazardous reconnaissance missions into tropical storms and typhoons to obtain accurate meteorological information. It was inactivated in 1960 due to budget reductions.

The squadron was reactivated in 1960 with a mixture of WB-50s, Boeing WB-47 Stratojets and Lockheed C-130 Hercules and resumed its typhoon hunting mission. The squadron was the last operator of the WB-50D Superfortress, retiring the last aircraft in 1965, when it operated C-130s.

Vietnam War 
Perhaps its best accomplishment was during the Vietnam War when Operation Popeye (Project Popeye/Motorpool/Intermediary-Compatriot) was a US military cloud seeding operation (running from 20 March until 5 July 1972) to extend the monsoon season over Laos, specifically areas of the Ho Chi Minh Trail. Operating WC-130A aircraft flying out of Udorn Royal Thai Air Force Base, the operation seeded clouds with silver iodide, resulting in the targeted areas seeing an extension of the monsoon period an average of 30 to 45 days. As the continuous rainfall slowed down the truck traffic, it was considered relatively successful. The 54th Weather Reconnaissance Squadron carried out the operation to "make mud, not war."

Cold War
In 1974, a newly converted WC-130 (serial number 65-965) was sent to investigate Typhoon Bess. The crew departed Clark Air Base in the Philippines with the callsign Swan 38. Radio contact with the aircraft was lost on 12 October 1974, apparently as the aircraft was heading into the typhoon's eye to make a second position fix. There were no radio transmissions indicating an emergency on board, and search teams could not locate the aircraft or its crew. All six crew members were listed as killed in action.

It was inactivated in 1987, along with its associated weather unit, Detachment 3, 1st Weather Wing.  The aircraft were dispersed to the remaining weather reconnaissance squadrons, the 53d Weather Reconnaissance Squadron and the Air Force Reserve unit, the 815th Weather Reconnaissance Squadron, both at Keesler Air Force Base, Mississippi.

Lineage
 Constituted as the 654th Bombardment Squadron, Heavy (Reconnaissance, Special) on 17 July 1944
 Activated on 9 August 1944
 Redesignated 54th Reconnaissance Squadron, Long Range, Weather on 4 September 1945
 Redesignated 54th Reconnaissance Squadron, Very Long Range, Weather on 27 November 1945
 Inactivated on 15 October 1947
 Redesignated 54th Strategic Reconnaissance Squadron, Medium, Weather on 22 January 1951
 Activated on 21 February 1951
 Redesignated 54th Weather Reconnaissance Squadron on 15 February 1954
 Discontinued and inactivated on 18 March 1960
 Organized 18 April 1962
 Inactivated on 30 September 1987

Assignments
 25th Bombardment Group, 9 August 1944
 Third Air Force, 8 September 1945
 311th Reconnaissance Wing, 27 November 1945 (attached to the Twentieth Air Force), 8 December 1945 – 28 February 1946
 Military Air Transport Service, 13 March 1946
 Air Weather Service, 20 March 1946
 43d Weather Wing, 1 August–15 October 1947
 2143d Air Weather Wing, 21 February 1951
 1st Weather Wing, 8 February 1954
 Department of the Air Force, 18 March 1960 (not organized)
 Military Air Transport Service, 8 February 1962
 9th Weather Reconnaissance Group, 18 April 1962
 9th Weather Reconnaissance Wing, 1 July 1965
 41st Rescue and Weather Reconnaissance Wing, 1 September 1975 – 30 September 1987

Stations
 RAF Watton (AAF-376), England, 9 August 1944
 Drew Field, Florida, August 1945
 North Field, Guam, 27 November 1945
 Buckley Field, Colorado, 20 March 1946
 Langley Field, Virginia, 2 June 1946
 Morrison Field, Florida, 21 Jul 1946-30 Jun 1947
 McClellan Field, California, 1 July 1947
 Fairfield-Suisun Army Air Base, California, 31 July 1947
 North Army Air Base, Guam, 2 August–15 October 1947
 Andersen Air Force Base, Guam, 21 February 1951 – 18 March 1960
 Andersen Air Force Base, Guam, 8 February 1962 – 30 September 1987

Aircraft

 North American B-25 Mitchell, 1944
 De Havilland Mosquito PR Mk. XVI, 1944-1945
 Martin B-26 Marauder, 1944-1945
 Lockheed P-38 Lightning, 1944-1945
 Boeing B-29 Superfortress, 1946-1947; 1951-1956
 Boeing WB-29 Superfortress, 1946-1947; 1951-1956
 Douglas C-47 Skytrain, 1946-1947
 Douglas C-54 Skymaster, 1951-1960
 Boeing C-97 Stratofreighter, 1952-1953
 Boeing TB-50 Superfortress, 1955; 1955-1960
 Boeing WB-50 Superfortress, 1955; 1955-1960
 Boeing WB-47 Stratojet, 1962-1965
 Lockheed C-130 Hercules, 1962-1965
 Lockheed WC-130, 1965-1987

Awards and campaigns

References
 Notes

Bibliography

External links
 54 Weather Reconnaissance Squadron - Lineage and History

Tropical cyclone meteorology
United States special-purpose aircraft
Weather 052
054